Latifi (adjective form of Latif) is an Albanian, Dari, Persian, Moroccan and Tajik Muslim surname. Notable people with the surname include:

 Ali Reza Latifi (born 1984), Iranian footballer
 Artan Latifi (born 1983), Kosovan footballer
 Babak Latifi (born 1987), Iranian footballer
 Habibollah Latifi, Kurdish activist from Iran
 Ilir Latifi (born 1983), Swedish mixed martial artist
 Liridon Latifi (born 1994), Albanian footballer
 Majid Latifi (born 1981), Iranian futsal player
 Michael Latifi, Canadian businessman
 Nicholas Latifi (born 1995), Canadian racing driver
 Otakhon Latifi (1936–1998), Tajik journalist and politician
 Younes Latifi (born 1984), French rapper

References 

Albanian-language surnames
Persian-language surnames
Dari-language surnames
Arabic-language surnames
Tajik-language surnames